Ranger is an unincorporated community in Dent County, in the U.S. state of Missouri.

History
A post office called Ranger was established in 1896, and remained in operation until 1917. The origin of the name Ranger is obscure.

References

Unincorporated communities in Dent County, Missouri
Unincorporated communities in Missouri